Calliostoma interruptus is a species of sea snail, a marine gastropod mollusk in the family Calliostomatidae.

Description

Distribution
This species occurs in the Indian Ocean off Mozambique and Tanzania.

References

 W. Wood (1828), Index testaceologicus : or, A catalogue of shells, British and foreign. Supplement

interruptus
Gastropods described in 1828